Eburna is a genus of sea snails, marine gastropod mollusks in the family Ancillariidae.

Species
The genus Eburna currently includes three accepted species:
 Eburna balteata (Swainson, 1825)
 Eburna glabrata (Linnaeus, 1758)
 Eburna lienardii (Bernardi, 1858)

Previously valid species brought into synonymy include:
 Eburna ambulacrum G. B. Sowerby I, 1825: synonym of Babylonia ambulacrum (G. B. Sowerby I, 1825) (original combination)
 Eburna australis G. B. Sowerby I, 1833: synonym of Zemira australis (G. B. Sowerby I, 1833) (original combination)
 Eburna borneensis G. B. Sowerby II, 1864: synonym of Babylonia borneensis (G. B. Sowerby II, 1864) (original combination)
 Eburna chemnitziana Fischer von Waldheim, 1807: synonym of Babylonia areolata (Link, 1807)
 Eburna chrysostoma G. B. Sowerby II, 1866: synonym of Babylonia spirata (Linnaeus, 1758)
 Eburna flavida Lamarck, 1801 : synonym of Eburna glabrata (Linnaeus, 1758)
 Eburna formosae G. B. Sowerby II, 1866: synonym of Babylonia formosae (G. B. Sowerby II, 1866) (original combination)
 Eburna immaculata Jousseaume, 1883: synonym of Babylonia ambulacrum (G. B. Sowerby I, 1825)
 Eburna japonica Reeve, 1842: synonym of Babylonia japonica (Reeve, 1842) (original combination)
 Eburna lienardi (Bernardi, 1859) : synonym of Eburna lienardii (Bernardi, 1859) (misspelling)
 Eburna lutosa Lamarck, 1816: synonym of Babylonia lutosa (Lamarck, 1816) (original combination)
 Eburna millepunctata Turton, 1932: synonym of Zemiropsis papillaris (G. B. Sowerby I, 1825)
 Eburna mirabilis Grateloup, 1834 †: synonym of Fissilabia mirabilis (Grateloup, 1834) † (original combination)
 Eburna molliana G. B. Sowerby II, 1859: synonym of Babylonia valentiana (Swainson, 1822)
 Eburna monilis Schumacher, 1817: synonym of Bullia vittata (Linnaeus, 1767)
 Eburna pacifica Swainson, 1822: synonym of Babylonia lutosa (Lamarck, 1816)
 Eburna papillaris G. B. Sowerby I, 1825: synonym of Zemiropsis papillaris (G. B. Sowerby I, 1825) (original combination)
 Eburna perforata G. B. Sowerby II, 1870: synonym of Babylonia perforata (G. B. Sowerby II, 1870) (original combination)
 Eburna semipicta G. B. Sowerby II, 1866: synonym of Babylonia spirata (Linnaeus, 1758)
 Eburna tessellata Swainson, 1823: synonym of Babylonia areolata (Link, 1807)
 Eburna troschelii Kobelt, 1881: synonym of Babylonia lutosa (Lamarck, 1816)
 Eburna valentiana Swainson, 1822: synonym of Babylonia valentiana (Swainson, 1822) (original combination)

References

 Bouchet P., Rocroi J.P., Hausdorf B., Kaim A., Kano Y., Nützel A., Parkhaev P., Schrödl M. & Strong E.E. (2017). Revised classification, nomenclator and typification of gastropod and monoplacophoran families. Malacologia. 61(1-2): 1-526; page(s): 91; note: type species fixation

External links
 Adams H. & Adams A. (1853-1858). The genera of recent Mollusca; arranged according to their organization. London, van Voorst. Vol. 1: xl + 484 pp.; vol. 2: 661 pp.; vol. 3: 138 pls.
  Kantor Yu.I., Fedosov A.E., Puillandre N., Bonillo C. & Bouchet P. (2017). Returning to the roots: morphology, molecular phylogeny and classification of the Olivoidea (Gastropoda: Neogastropoda). Zoological Journal of the Linnean Society. 180(3): 493-541

Ancillariidae